Nirmal Kaur Saini (8 October 1938  13 June 2021) was an Indian volleyball player and captain of the India women's national volleyball team. She was the wife of athlete Milkha Singh and the mother of Jeev Milkha Singh.

Biography
She was born on 8 October 1938, in Sheikhupura, Punjab (now part of Pakistan). She was Director of Sports for Women in the State Department. She graduated from Panjab University with a master's degree in Political Science in 1958.

Personal life
Nirmal Saini later married Milkha Singh. She was the mother of 3 daughters and 1 son, golfer Jeev Milkha Singh and lived in Chandigarh. In 1999, they adopted the seven-year-old son of Havildar Bikram Singh, who had died in the Battle of Tiger Hill.

She died on 13 June 2021, due to COVID-19 in Mohali; her husband died five days later.

References

Punjabi people
Indian women's volleyball players
1938 births
People from Sheikhupura
Sportswomen from Punjab, India
Volleyball players from Punjab, India
20th-century Indian women
20th-century Indian people
2021 deaths
Deaths from the COVID-19 pandemic in India